Sidi Yahya may refer to:

People
Arabic name of John the Baptist, who is a prophet in Islam.
Sidi Yaya Keita, Malian footballer

Places

Morocco
Sidi Yahya El Gharb, town in Kénitra Province 
Sidi Yahya Ou Youssef, commune in Khénifra Province
Sidi Yahya Ou Saad, commune in Sefrou Province
Sidi Yahya Bni Zeroual, commune in Taounate Province

Algeria
Sidi Yahia, Algeria

Mali
Sidi Yahya Mosque in Mali